Fatma Boussaha (born January 22 1942 in Zaghouan - died October 27 2015) was a Tunisian Mezwed singer.

Biography 

Fatma Boussaha performed several titles like Ya ami echiffour (Hey my uncle the driver) and Ya karhebt Kamel (Hey the car of Kamel). She was known for her song Achchibani wassa (Laisse passer le Vieuxard) in 1999. Her last title, Trabek ghali ya Touness, (Your dust is precious, Tunis) dates from 2012.  At one time, she was banned from broadcasting on Tunisian television as were other mezoued artists. Boussaha died on Tuesday October 27, 2015 at her home.

At the end of her life, touched by cancer, she found herself alone facing her fight, leading the Ministry of Culture to take charge of her care within the framework of her program of assistance to artists.

Discography

References

External links 

People from Zaghouan Governorate
1942 births
2015 deaths
20th-century Tunisian  women singers
21st-century Tunisian  women singers